Geoffrey "Geoff" Kime (born 9 January 1958) is an English–Australian former professional darts player.

Career

Kime won the 2009 WDF World Cup men's pairs alongside Anthony Fleet.

Kime won the 2011 Oceanic Masters to qualify for the 2012 PDC World Darts Championship. He played against Mervyn King in the first round, but failed to win a leg and lost 3–0 in sets.

World Championship performances

PDC
 2012: 1st Round (lost to Mervyn King 0–3) (sets)

References

External links

Living people
Australian darts players
English emigrants to Australia
1958 births
Professional Darts Corporation associate players
British Darts Organisation players
People from Brisbane